Chief of the Defence Staff is the head of the Lithuanian Defence Staff responsible for the administrative, operational, and logistical needs of the Lithuanian Armed Forces.

List of chiefs

Chiefs of the General Staff (1918–1940)

Chiefs of the Defence Staff (since 1990)

Notes

References

Military of Lithuania
Lists of Lithuanian military personnel
Military chiefs of staff